Giovanni Barrella (30 November 1884 – 23 September 1967) was an Italian film actor, writer and painter.

Biography
Barrella was born in Milan. His father was a major in the Napoleonic Army. Barrella studied Fine Arts. He worked for Teatro Argentina in Rome and for the Compagnia Lombarda of Alberto Colantuoni. In 1931, he founded his own theatrical company with Paolo Bonecchio. He also published poetry and theatre plays. He died in Erba in 1967.

Selected filmography
 Le dame nere (1912)
 Loyalty of Love (1934)
 Departure (1938)
 Malombra (1942)
 Vanity (1947)
 Tragic Spell (1951)

External links

References 

1884 births
1967 deaths
Italian male film actors
Italian male silent film actors
20th-century Italian writers
20th-century Italian male writers
Male actors from Milan
20th-century Italian male actors